Zhongli Chun (fl. 342 BC), commonly known as Zhong Wuyan in legends, was a Chinese occultist and consort of the King Xuan of Qi (r. 342–324 BC).

She is described as an "ugly" woman, a Qin-subject of the age of forty, when she approached the king and successfully offered herself in marriage.

She is known for allegedly having the ability to make herself invisible, an art she demonstrated to the king and which attracted his attention.  She is famous for offering the king the Four Dangers threatening the safety of his state.  The king was impressed and reformed his state in accordance with her advice.

Legacy

She is included in the Biographies of Eminent women (Lienü zhuan).

References 

4th-century BC births
4th-century BC deaths
4th-century BC Chinese people
4th-century BC Chinese women
Ancient occultists